The 2012 Craven District Council election took place on 3 May 2012 to elect members of Craven District Council in North Yorkshire, England. One third of the council was up for election and the Conservative party stayed in overall control of the council.

After the election, the composition of the council was as follows:
Conservative 16
Independent 10
Liberal Democrats 4

Background
Before the election the Conservatives controlled the council with 30 seats, compared to 9 independents and 3 Liberal Democrats. The Conservative leader of the council, Chris Knowles-Fitton, was among the councillors to defend their seats, standing in Barden Fell ward, while in Ingleton and Clapham, the sitting independent councillor David Ireton stood at the election as a Conservative. Meanwhile, the Conservative councillor for Hellifield and Long Preston for the past 13 years, Helen Firth, resigned from the council in March 2012 to leave that seat vacant before the election.

Election result
The number of Conservative councillors was reduced by 2 to 16, but they retained a majority of 2 seats over the 10 independents and 4 Liberal Democrats.

Independents gained 2 seats from the Conservatives after John Kerwin-Davy took Skipton North from the Conservatives, while Chris Moorby won by 34 votes the seat in Hellifeild and Long Preston vacated by Conservative Helen Firth. However the Conservatives picked up a seat in Ingleton and Clapham as David Ireton won the seat as a Conservative, after previously being an independent councillor for the same seat. Meanwhile, the Liberal Democrats also gained up a seat from the Conservatives in Skipton East, where Eric Jaquin took the seat from Pam Heseltine.

Ward results

References

2012
2012 English local elections
2010s in North Yorkshire